Pavel Černý may refer to:

 Pavel Černý (footballer, born 1962), Czechoslovakia international footballer 1989–1991
 Pavel Černý (footballer, born 1985), current Gambrinus liga footballer